Southington Township is one of the twenty-four townships of Trumbull County, Ohio, United States.  The 2000 census found 3,817 people in the township.

Geography
Located in the western part of the county, it borders the following townships:
Farmington Township - north
Bristol Township - northeast corner
Champion Township - east
Warren Township - southeast corner
Braceville Township - south
Windham Township, Portage County - southwest corner
Nelson Township, Portage County - west
Parkman Township, Geauga County - northwest corner

No municipalities are located in Southington Township, although the unincorporated community of Southington lies at the center of the township.

Government
The township is governed by a three-member board of trustees, who are elected in November of odd-numbered years to a four-year term beginning on the following January 1. Two are elected in the year after the presidential election and one is elected in the year before it. There is also an elected township fiscal officer, who serves a four-year term beginning on April 1 of the year after the election, which is held in November of the year before the presidential election. Vacancies in the fiscal officership or on the board of trustees are filled by the remaining trustees.

Public services
Students in Southington attend Southington Local Schools.  It comprises Southington Elementary School, Southington Middle School, and Chalker High School. The elementary, middle, and high schools are all on the same campus.

Important highways in Southington Township include U.S. Route 422 and State Routes 534 and 305.

Notable residents

Rick Badanjek, NFL player
Chad Petty, baseball player
Mike Tyson, boxer

References

External links
Township website
County website

Townships in Trumbull County, Ohio
Townships in Ohio